William Robert Parks (June 4, 1849 – October 10, 1911) was an American left fielder, pitcher, and manager in Major League Baseball from Easton, Pennsylvania. A native of Easton, Pennsylvania, Parks played for the Washington Nationals and Philadelphia White Stockings, both of the National Association, in 1875.  Then, in 1876, he played one game for the National League's Boston Red Caps. He was also manager of the Nationals for the last eight games of the 1875 season, guiding them to a record of 1–7 after they had gone 4–16 under teammate Holly Hollingshead.

In 16 games as a pitcher he was 4–8 with 9 complete games in 11 starts and an earned run average of 3.54. In 30 total games played he batted .174 with 6 runs batted in and 13 runs scored.

Parks died in his home town of Easton, Pennsylvania, at the age of 62, and is interred at Easton Cemetery.

References

External links

 Retrosheet

Major League Baseball left fielders
Major League Baseball pitchers
19th-century baseball players
Washington Nationals (NA) players
Philadelphia White Stockings players
Boston Red Caps players
Baseball player-managers
Baseball players from Pennsylvania
1849 births
1911 deaths